Manado Independent School (MIS) is a private institution which provides education from Kindergarten age (K1) to Senior High School (Grade 12). MIS was the first school in the region to be granted an international school license by the National Education Department as a school of international standard (Sekolah Berstandar International). All sections of MIS are accredited by the Badan Akreditasi Sekolah Nasional of Indonesia, with "A" (excellent) classifications.

Students enrolled at MIS come from countries such as Australia, Sweden, the Netherlands, the Philippines, Singapore, Japan, Germany, Malaysia, Papua New Guinea, Korea and Indonesia. All graduating students of Grade 6, 9 and 12 receive an MIS Diploma of Study from MIS International Standard exams, as well as choosing to take the National Examinations as a prerequisite to study in other Indonesian schools and universities. Several graduating students in grade 12 have been accepted into overseas universities.

As of 2015, the school has changed its name from Manado International School to Manado Independent School.

Location
The school is located at Kolongan village (North Minahasa Regency, North Sulawesi Province) about 12 km. east of Manado and 30 km. west of Bitung, near residential areas as well as shopping centers and the international airport.

MIS logo
 Triangle with an open book.
 Globe with a flame on top.
 Colors are gold, dark blue and maroon.

The shapes symbolize:
 the book symbolizes the Bible as the foundation (Proverbs 2:20).
 the globe symbolizes the quality of education.
 the flame symbolizes the students that graduate from MIS. 
 the red triangle symbolizes a torch handle, which represent the hope that good influence will be passed on.
 The blue triangle symbolizes the relation with God and other people.

Service
MIS provides:
 English as the medium of instruction,
 Classes with a maximum of 24 students,
 Accident and life insurance coverage for each student,
 School buses,
 Showers for use after classes.

Facilities
 Air-conditioned classrooms, 
 Music room, 
 Science laboratories, 
 Computer laboratory with Internet access.
 Wi-Fi hotspot for internet access on the campus.
 Outdoor facilities including a swimming pool, playground, adventure and sports field, basketball, tennis and volleyball courts.
 A gymnasium that provides space for badminton, table tennis, aerobics and fitness center.
 Full service cafeteria
 School clinic staffed with a nurse and an on-call doctor.
 Hall of Residence

The Residence Hall

The MIS Residence Hall provides the following facilities:
 Air-conditioned rooms,
 Laundry service,
 Wi-Fi (hotspot) internet access,
 Sport facilities,
 Cafeteria,
 Guest room,
 Security.

Curriculum
MIS integrates both the National curriculum and a world curriculum. English is used as the medium of instruction for all classes except for Bahasa Indonesia, PPKN and Mandarin. The Kindergarten (Early Childhood Program) uses the Developmental Approach, which focuses on the individual growth of each child and also uses English as the medium of instruction.

MIS offers the following minor subjects: elective such as Information technology, Web Design, Programming; Music and Arts such as Piano, Violin, Guitar, Recorder, Band; Sports such as Futsal, Swimming, Soccer, Badminton, Basketball, Volley Ball; Extracurricular such as Cooking, Pathfinder, Driving; and Language such as Mandarin, Basic and Advanced English during class hours.

Grade levels

External links

International schools in Indonesia
Education in North Sulawesi
Buildings and structures in North Sulawesi